Otto Anninger (February 20, 1874 – July 5, 1954, Lucerne) was a major industrialist and an art collector.

Life 
Anniger married Clara (née Wolf), (born January 12, 1886, Vienna; died September 23, 1938, Paris) They lived in the "Villa Anninger" located at Vienna XIX, Lannerstraße 36. The Anningers also had a villa in Vienna XIX, Billrothstraße 46.

Anniger had a company "W. Abeles & Co.", agency and commission trade in Vienna I., located at Schottenbastei 4, as well as factories in Teesdorf, Lower Austria, and Dugaresa, Yugoslavia. He was a shareholder of Baumwoll-Import und Handels-A.G. in Bratislava, shareholder of the spinning and weaving mill Teesdorf-Schönau in Vienna.

Art collection 
Anninger collected paintings and reliefs by, among others, Robert and Franz von Alt, Canaletto and Erwin Pendl.

Nazi persecution 
When Austria merged with Nazi Germany in the Anschluss of 1938, the Anningers fled to Paris. His wife committed suicide.  Anninger then fled to the U.S.

In 1938, Anniger's company "W. Abeles & Co." was Aryanized (transferred to a non-Jewish owner) by the Austrian Kontrollbank, All his properties were confiscated.;

According to the Louvre Museum in Paris, Anniger donated a painting by Jan de Heem in 1939.

References

External links 
 Provenance research Austrian government

1954 deaths
1874 births
Jewish art collectors
Persecution of Jews
Nazi-looted art
Art and cultural repatriation after World War II
Subjects of Nazi art appropriations
Emigrants from Austria after the Anschluss